is a Shinto shrine in Kan'onji, Kagawa Prefecture, Japan. Located within Kotohiki Park, itself part of the Setonaikai National Park, there is an aetiological legend that sees the god Hachiman appearing to the eighth-century monk Nisshō Shōnin while he was playing a koto on board ship. The legend is depicted in the Sanuki-no-kuni Shippōzan Hachiman Kotobikigū engi, records that are an Important Cultural Property of the City. As a result of the enforced separation of Buddhism and Shinto during the Meiji period, the enshrined image of Amida Nyorai was transferred to nearby Kannon-ji. There is a lively annual festival.

See also

 Hachiman shrine
 Shikoku 88 temple pilgrimage
 Shinbutsu bunri

References

Shinto shrines in Kagawa Prefecture
Hachiman shrines
703
8th-century religious buildings and structures